The following outline is provided as an overview of and topical guide to archaeology:

Archaeology – study of human cultures through the recovery, documentation, and analysis of material remains and environmental data, including architecture, artifacts, biofacts, human remains, and landscapes.

What type of thing is archaeology? 
Archaeology can be described as all of the following:
 Academic discipline
 Science
 Social science

Essence of archaeology
 Archaeological record
 Archaeological science
 Archaeological site
 Archaeological theory
 Artifacts
 Biofacts
 Excavation

Branches of archaeology

Archaeological practice
 Cultural Resources Management
 Archaeological ethics
 Urban archaeology

Archaeological science

Archaeological science
 Archaeometry
 Dendrochronology
 Isotope analysis
 Palynology
 Radiocarbon dating
 Zooarchaeology
 Geoarchaeology
 Bioarchaeology
 Archaeogenetics
 Computational archaeology

Archaeological subdisciplines
 Ethnoarchaeology
 Taphonomy

By location
 African archaeology
 Australian archaeology
 European archaeology
 Russian archaeology
 Archaeology of the Americas
 Archaeology of China
 Archaeology of Israel

By time period

 Industrial archaeology
 Near Eastern archaeology
 Biblical archaeology
 Medieval archaeology
 Historical archaeology
 Post-medieval archaeology
 Industrial archaeology
 Contemporary archaeology

Specialities
 Aerial archaeology
 Archaeoastronomy
 Archaeological science
 Archaeozoology
 Archaeobotany or paleoethnobotany
 Battlefield archaeology
 Computational archaeology
 Experimental archaeology
 Environmental archaeology
 Forensic archaeology
 Landscape archaeology
 Maritime archaeology
 Museum studies
 Palaeoarchaeology
 Paleopathology

History of archaeology

History of archaeology
 Table of years in archaeology

Archaeological methods

 Archaeological excavation
 Archaeological field survey
 Archaeological geophysics
 Underwater archaeology

Archaeological theory

Archaeological theory
 Great ages archaeology
 Functionalism
 Processualism / "New Archaeology"
 Post-processualism
 Cognitive archaeology
 Gender archaeology
 Feminist archaeology
 History of archaeology

Archaeology by Period
List of archaeological periods

 Lower Palaeolithic
 Middle Palaeolithic
 Upper Palaeolithic
 Mesolithic
 Neolithic
 Chalcolithic
 Bronze Age
 Iron Age
 Romans
 Anglo-Saxons
 Pre-Columbian
 Medieval
 Industrial

Archaeological sites

Archaeological site
 Feature
 Cairn
 Megalithic tomb
 Pyramid
 Sepulchre
 Tomb
 Votive site

Archaeological site features

Archaeological artifacts

 Assemblage
 Grave goods
 Hoard
 Manuport
 Sarcophagus
 Small finds
 Stone tool
 Votive deposit

Other archaeology concepts
 Alignment
 Archaeological association
 Archaeological context
 Archaeological culture
 Archaeological field survey
 Archaeological horizon
 Archaeological natural
 Archaeological phase
 Archaeological plan
 Archaeological record
 Archaeological sequence
 Biofact
 Collecting
 Colluvium
 Cropmarks
 Cultural resources management
 Cut
 Dark earth
 Dating methodology
 Dendrochronology
 Deposit model
 Ecofact
 Excavation
 Fill
 Fossil
 Geologic time scale
 Geomatics
 Grave robbing
 Ground-penetrating radar
 Harris matrix
 Law of superposition
 Lithic analysis
 Post excavation
 Projectile point
 Radiocarbon dating
 Relationship
 Seriation
 Stratification

Influential archaeologists

List of archaeologists

Archaeology lists
 List of archaeological periods
 List of archaeologists
 List of Russian historians
 List of designations under the Protection of Wrecks Act
 List of archaeological sites by country
 List of archaeological sites by continent and age
 List of Paleolithic sites in China
 List of paleoethnobotanists
 Table of years in archaeology

External links
The Society for American Archaeology
The World Archaeological Congress
The Archaeological Institute of America

 
Archaeology
Archaeology
Outlines of social sciences